Lachnaia italica is a species of short-horned leaf beetles belonging to the family Chrysomelidae, subfamily Clytrinae.

This species is found in Italy, France, and Slovenia.

Adults mainly feeds on Rosaceae (Rubus) and Fagaceae (Quercus) species. Larvae live in nests of red wood ant (Formica rufa), feeding on vegetable refuses.

Subspecies
Lachnaia italica italica (Weise, 1881)
Lachnaia italica occidentalis  (Grasso, 1963)

References

Horn A., 1951 - Verzeichnis der Kafer Mitteleuropas (Deutschland, Osterreich, Tschechoslovakei) mit kurzen funistischen Angaben - A. Keren Verlag, Stuttgart

External links
Biolib
Culex.biol.uni.wroc.pl

Beetles of Europe
Clytrini
Beetles described in 1881
Taxa named by Julius Weise